Kevin Leiser (born 3 September 1993) is a German teacher and politician of the Social Democratic Party (SPD) who has been serving as member of the Bundestag since 2021.

Early life and education
Leiser was born 1993 in the German town of Crailsheim.

Political career
Leiser was elected to the Bundestag in the 2021 elections, representing the Schwäbisch Hall – Hohenlohe district. In parliament, he has since been serving on the Defence Committee and the Committee on Economic Cooperation and Development.

References 

Living people
1993 births
Social Democratic Party of Germany politicians
Members of the Bundestag 2021–2025
21st-century German politicians